Persoonia virgata is a species of flowering plant in the family Proteaceae and is endemic to coastal areas of eastern Australia.

Description
Flowering mostly occurs from 
December to March.

Taxonomy
Persoonia virgata was first formally described in 1810 by Robert Brown in the Transactions of the Linnean Society of London from specimens collected near Sandy Cape.

Distribution and habitat
This geebung grows in heath to forest mostly on old sand dunes in near-coastal areas between Shoalwater Bay  in Queensland and Forster in New South Wales.

References

virgata
Flora of New South Wales
Flora of Queensland
Proteales of Australia
Plants described in 1810
Taxa named by Robert Brown (botanist, born 1773)